Ijuhya is a genus of fungi in the class Sordariomycetes. It consists of seven species.

References

Sordariomycetes genera
Bionectriaceae